The Norfolk and Suffolk Broads Act 1988 is an Act of the Parliament of the United Kingdom which created the Broads Authority. It is the framework for the creation of Broads, an area qualifying for special conservation on account of its ecological value and giving the Broads equivalent status and funding to the national parks of England and Wales.

The first ten British national parks were designated as such in the 1950s under the National Parks and Access to the Countryside Act 1949 in mostly poor-quality agricultural upland and designations subsequent to the Broads are also under the auspices of the 1949 Act. The Broads required separate legislation to give special consideration to the needs of navigation. The Act requires the Broads Authority to take account of the area's national importance and the need to protect it. It must promote public enjoyment, preserve natural amenity and maintain, improve and develop the navigation area.

See also
National parks of the United Kingdom
National parks of England and Wales
Areas of Outstanding Natural Beauty in England and Wales

References

National parks of England and Wales
United Kingdom Acts of Parliament 1988
The Broads
Acts of the Parliament of the United Kingdom concerning England
1988 in England
20th century in Norfolk
20th century in Suffolk